Riverdale Ward was a municipal ward in the city of Ottawa, Canada. It was created in 1929, when it split off from Capital Ward. The ward consisted of that part of Ottawa between Bronson Avenue and what is now Nicholas Street, between the Rideau River and the Rideau Canal. This area consists of the present day neighbourhoods of Old Ottawa East and Old Ottawa South.

The Ottawa South part of this Ward became part of Ward 5 in 1952, while the Ottawa East part was annexed by Ward 3.

Aldermen

References

Ottawa wards
1929 establishments in Ontario